Wentworth is an Australian television drama series which premiered on 1 May 2013. The series, including its cast members and crew, have been the recipient of several awards and nominations, most notably at the Logie Awards, AACTA Awards and the ASTRA Awards.

AACTA Awards

ASTRA Awards

Australian Directors Guild

Australian Screen Editors

Australian Writers' Guild Awards

Equity Ensemble Awards

Logie Awards

National Dreamtime Awards

Screen Producers Australia

TV Tonight Awards

Notes

References

Lists of awards by television series